Beth Taylor is a Scottish operatic mezzo-soprano, who has performed mainly in Europe. At the Oper Frankfurt, she performed a title role in Rossini's Bianca e Falliero.

Life 
Born in Glasgow, Taylor studied at the Royal Conservatoire of Scotland, graduating as Master of Arts in 2018.. She has been coached by Jennifer Larmore. She achieved first prize at the Gianni Bergamo Classic Music Award in 2018, and third prize of the Wigmore Hall's competition. She attended the Samling Institute for Young Artists in 2019.

Taylor appeared as Arnalta in Monteverdi's L’incoronazione di Poppea with the Longborough Festival Opera in 2018, as Marcellina in Mozart's Le nozze di Figaro at the New Generation Festival in Florence in 2019, and in the trouser role of Bradamante in Handel's Alcina at the Opéra de Dijon and the Opéra national de Lorraine in Nancy in 2020. Taylor appeared at the Oper Frankfurt first in 2021 as Dardano in Handel's Amadigi. Her mezzo-soprano was the only lower voice, and a reviewer noted that she portrayed her character with fine vocal lines and remarkable coloraturas. The work had been planned for 2020, and in collaboration with the Tirol Festival in Erl, to conclude a focus of Rossini's works. A reviewer noted her full voice, with volume in the middle register, precise and flexible coloraturas, and dramatic outbursts, portraying the fall of the character from a victor in battle to giving himself up, in duets of great harmony with Heather Phillips as Bianca.

In concert, she has appeared with orchestras including the Royal Scottish National Orchestra, the Netherlands Radio Symphony Orchestra and La Cetra Baroque Orchestra.

References

External links 
 
 Beth Taylor / Mezzo-soprano operabase.com
 Heather Phillips debuts in Frankfurt (management) fischerartists.com February 2022
 Beth Margaret Taylor scottishvoices.org
 Bannatyne-Scott, Brian: Interview: Beth Taylor edinburghmusicreview.com 6 August 2021

Scottish operatic mezzo-sopranos
1993 births
Living people
21st-century Scottish women opera singers
Alumni of the Royal Conservatoire of Scotland
Musicians from Glasgow